Beef tea may refer to 

Bovril
Oxo (food)
Broth